Nov or NOV may refer to:

 November, the 11th month of the year in the Julian and Gregorian calendars
 Nav, Asalem (also , Nov or Nāv), a village in Gilan Province, Iran
 Nov, Golan Heights, an Israeli moshav (a cooperative agricultural community) on the Israeli-occupied Golan Heights
 Nov district, former name of Spitamen District, Sughd Province, Tajikistan
 Nov, Tajikistan, a locality in Sughd Region of Tajikistan
 Nov, a former name of Navkat, a town in Sughd Region of Tajikistan
 Nob, Israel (also Nov), a biblical location near Jerusalem
 Albano Machado Airport (IATA airport code NOV), an airport in Huambo, Angola
 Novena MRT station (MRT station abbreviation NOV), a Mass Rapid Transit station in Novena, Singapore
 Nation of Violence, the nickname of professional wrestler Samoa Joe
 NOV Inc., an oil rig manufacturer.
 NC Vouliagmeni, a Greek aquatic sports club
 Non obstante verdicto (also JNOV, judgment notwithstanding the verdict), a plea in a U.S. civil lawsuit that the judge should overrule a jury finding as unreasonable and wrong
 NOV (gene), "nephroblastoma overexpressed", a gene coding for signaling proteins
 News Overview, articles index file format used by Usenet servers and newsreaders
 Novial (ISO 639-3 code nov), a constructed international auxiliary language
 People's Liberation Army of Macedonia, a Communist resistance army during World War II